Hannah Ocuish (sometimes "Occuish"; March 1774 – December 20, 1786) was a 12-year old Pequot Native American girl with an intellectual disability who was hanged on December 20, 1786, in New London, Connecticut for the murder of Eunice Bolles, the 6-year old daughter of a wealthy farmer. She is believed to be the youngest person executed in the United States. In recent years, Ocuish's guilt, culpability, and the fairness of her trial have come into question.

Early life 
Henry Channing, a minister, published a sermon entitled God Admonishing His People of their Duty ... a Sermon ... Occasioned by the Execution of Hannah Ocuish, a Mixed Girl, Aged 12 Years and 9 Months, for the Murder of Eunice Bolles, Aged 6 Years and 6 Months. It describes the negative and racially prejudiced light in which her early life was presented to the court, referring to her Native American mother as an "abandoned creature", and characterizing Ocuish as a fearsome violent criminal who at the age of 6 nearly killed another victim during a robbery of a gold necklace and clothing:

In modern US law, character evidence cannot be admitted to prove guilt. According to FRE 404, "Evidence of a person’s character or character trait is not admissible to prove that on a particular occasion the person acted in accordance with the character or trait." Although a prosecutor may present the evidence for a different purpose, the trial judge must not consider it when determining guilt.

Murder trial

Murder

The victim, six-year-old Eunice Bolles, the daughter of a wealthy farmer, was found dead on July 21, 1786. Ocuish was questioned and said four boys were near the scene of the crime. When the boys could not be found, the investigators further questioned her and she confessed.

Karen Halttunen, a history professor at the University of California at Davis, summarized the crime:

Arrest 
One day after the murder, Ocuish was accused of killing Bolles and confessed. She was arrested for and charged with (indicted by a grand jury for) the murder and was held in pre-trial prison. The murder was reported in the July 27, 1786, issue of the Norwich Packet.

The only inculpatory evidence against her was her confession to the investigators. The confession was never corroborated by anyone besides the investigators. The Fifth Amendment was not available at the time of the events.

Her confession reportedly included baiting Bolles with calico, beating her nearly to death with a rock, strangling her to death, and placing rocks to stage an accident. The confession specified that the motive was that Bolles had earlier accused her of the theft of strawberries.

Trial 
During Ocuish's trial, she pleaded "not guilty" at the direction of defense counsel and seemed unfazed and calm as the rest of those present, including the presiding judge, were brought to tears multiple times. The court found her guilty.

Sentencing 
Although Ocuish's youth was considered, it could not be a mitigating factor, so the judge decided: "The sparing of you on account of your age would, as the law says, be of dangerous consequence to the public, by holding up an idea, that children might commit such atrocious crimes with impunity." He sentenced Ocuish to death by hanging. Under the state of law at that time, age and disability were not mitigating factors: a reporter wrote, "the age of a criminal was considered inconsequential; swift and relentless punishment was viewed as the only practicable method of keeping the lawless element in check." Additionally, under the Murder Act 1752, a conviction of murder required a mandatory death sentence by hanging within 48 hours.

The Supreme Court deemed capital punishment for juveniles in the United States unconstitutional in 2005 as cruel and unusual punishment. However, this affects only later cases and does not apply retroactively to past executions.

Execution 
As she awaited execution, Hannah's anxiety grew worse, and she spent most of the day of her hanging in tears. At her execution, she thanked the sheriff for his kindness as she stepped forward to be hanged. Spectators to the execution said that Ocuish "appeared greatly afraid, and seemed to want somebody to help her."

Reexamination 
In March 2020, leaders of the New London chapter of the NAACP assembled a group including historians, tribal members, attorneys, and the Connecticut chapter of the Innocence Project to re-examine Ocuish's case to attempt to determine Ocuish's guilt and whether or not she received a fair trial. While the NAACP-assembled group has cautioned that they may not be able to reach a conclusion, if evidence favors Ocuish's innocence or her receiving an unfair trial, it will be decided whether or not to recommend an exoneration to the Connecticut General Assembly. It has been suggested by the group and by others that her race, age, disability, and gender may have played a role in her conviction and sentence. The group will also attempt to contact remaining descendants of Ocuish and Eunice Bolles.

See also 

 Capital punishment in the United States
 List of people executed in Connecticut
 George Stinney
 Alice Glaston
 John Dean
 Mary (slave)

Sources

References

Further reading

External links 
 
 

People from Connecticut
1774 births
1786 deaths
American children
18th-century Native Americans
American people with disabilities
Executed people from Connecticut
American female murderers
American murderers of children
Executed children
People executed by Connecticut by hanging
American people executed for murder
Executed American women
People convicted of murder by Connecticut
Juvenile offenders executed by the United States
18th-century executions of American people
People with intellectual disability
People of colonial Connecticut
Pequot people
18th-century Native American women
Native American people from Connecticut